The FIBT World Championships 1989 took place in Cortina d'Ampezzo, Italy (Bobsleigh) and St. Moritz, Switzerland (Skeleton). Cortina hosted the championships for the eighth time, having hosted the event previously in 1937 (Two-man), 1939 (Four-man), 1950, 1954, 1960, 1966, and 1981. Meanwhile, St. Moritz hosted a championship event for the record sixteenth time. The Swiss city had hosted the event previously in 1931 (Four-man), 1935 (Four-man), 1937 (Four-man), 1938 (Two-man), 1939 (Two-man), 1947, 1955, 1957, 1959, 1965, 1970, 1974, 1977, 1982, and 1987. The skeleton event became an official championship event this year, albeit at a separate location from the bobsleigh event. They would not be at the same location other than St. Moritz for the first time until the 1996 championships in Calgary, Alberta, Canada.

Two-man bobsleigh

Four-man bobsleigh

Baracchi becomes the first person to medal in both bobsleigh and skeleton at the championships.

Men's skeleton

Medal table

References
2-Man bobsleigh World Champions
4-Man bobsleigh World Champions
Men's skeleton World Champions

1989
1989 in Italian sport
Sport in Cortina d'Ampezzo
1989 in bobsleigh
International sports competitions hosted by Italy
Bobsleigh in Italy